Southern Pacific Railroad 2467 is a preserved 4-6-2 “Pacific” type steam locomotive. Built by Baldwin in 1921, No. 2467 was used by the Southern Pacific Railroad to pull passenger trains, until it was retired from service in 1956. On July 25, 1960, the locomotive was donated to the city of Oakland, California, who had it placed on display at the Harrison Railroad Park. In July 1990 a restoration began by the Friends of the 2467, which later merged into the Pacific Locomotive Association. In June 1999 it was returned to operation and made an appearance at Railfair 1999. Although serviceable, SP 2467 is currently on static display while on loan from its operator, Pacific Locomotive Association, Inc., to the California State Railroad Museum in Sacramento, California.

Southern Pacific 2467 has two surviving siblings. P-8 class Southern Pacific 2472 is owned by the Golden Gate Railroad Museum and once operated on occasional services at the Niles Canyon Railway until 2015. It is now at the Northwestern Pacific Railroad, where it is currently undergoing its 1,472-day inspection and overhaul. P-10 class Southern Pacific 2479 is owned by the California Trolley and Railroad Corporation and is undergoing restoration to operating condition at the Santa Clara County Fairgrounds in San Jose, California. As of 2022, 2479 has been moved to the Niles Canyon Railway in Sunol, CA, for completion of its restoration, and eventual operation of excursions.

History

Early years 
No. 2467 is one of 15 4-6-2 heavy "Pacific" type steam locomotives built by Baldwin Locomotive Works in January 1921 for the Southern Pacific Railroad (SP), designated the P-8 class, and numbered 2461-2475. These locomotives were initially used to serve the SP’s long-distance passenger trains, such as the Overland Route from Ogden, Utah, to Oakland, California and the Sunset Limited between Los Angeles and El Paso, Texas, until the SP’s larger 4-8-2 “Mountain” types replaced them. No. 2467 pulled its last long-distance passenger train from Fresno to Oakland on February 10, 1945. 

The locomotive was subsequently reassigned to pull local passenger trains and commuter trains between Sacramento and Oakland and the San Francisco-San Jose, California, commuter route. No. 2467 pulled its last revenue train on December 26, 1956, before it was removed from the SP’s active list. On July 25, 1960, No. 2467 was donated to the city of Oakland, where the locomotive was put on static display at a park that would later become Harrison Railroad Park. The latter idea came from District 3 City Councilman Howard Rilea, who was a retired railroad engineer who had ridden on No. 2467 during its final long-distance run in 1945.

Restoration and excursion service 
In the early 1980s, a group called the “Friends of the 2467” (later known as the Pacific Locomotive Association (PLA)) was formed with the goal of restoring No. 2467 to operational status. In July 1990, the locomotive was removed from Harrison Railroad Park and moved to a nearby yard, where a restoration effort called Project 2467 commenced. The restoration process included replacing the flues and tubes, fabricating the boiler jacketing, repairing the firebox, and refurbishing the cab. In May 1999, No. 2467 was successfully test fired, and the following month, the locomotive was approved to legally operate by the Federal Railroad Administration (FRA). 

After final applications were made to the locomotive, the restoration crew moved No. 2467 to Sacramento, where it attended Railfair ‘99 at the California State Railroad Museum (CSRM). Once the fair was over, No. 2467 was towed to the Golden Gate Railroad Museum (GGRM)(Which owns fellow SP P-8 No. 2472) at the Hunters Point shipyard in San Francisco, where No. 2467 was stored and put into occasional excursion service. In January 2003, the GGRM hosted a photo session that featured Numbers 2467 and 2472 operating together.

Disposition 
In August 2005, the US Navy ordered the GGRM to vacate all of their equipment from Hunters Point, since ownership of the site was being turned over to the city of San Francisco. No. 2467, which was still owned by the PLA, was subsequently towed back to the CSRM in Sacramento, where a long-term loan was signed to keep the locomotive in storage at the CSRM’s property. As of 2022, No. 2467 is still stored serviceable while being displayed inside the CSRM’s main hall.

See also 

 Southern Pacific 2353
 Southern Pacific 745
 Southern Pacific 786
 Santa Fe 1010

References 

2467
Baldwin locomotives
4-6-2 locomotives
Individual locomotives of the United States
Preserved steam locomotives of California
Standard gauge locomotives of the United States